Brame Hillyard (23 August 1876  – 18 June 1959) was a British tennis player. He was born in Darlington, England and died in Tonbridge, England.

Hillyard is notable for being the first tennis player to appear at Wimbledon wearing shorts rather than trousers.  He did so in 1930 on Court 10. Bunny Austin, three years later, was the first male player to do so on Centre Court. Hillyard reached the quarter-finals of the event in 1903.

References

1876 births
1959 deaths
Sportspeople from Darlington
English male tennis players
British male tennis players
Tennis people from County Durham